Leicester Austin Friary is a former Augustinian Friary in Leicester, England.

History
Leicester Austin Friary was founded in 1254 and dedicated to St Catherine. It was enlarged in 1304 by Thomas, 2nd Earl of Lancaster.

In 1372 the general chapter of the Order of Austin Friars was held at the friary. It was around the same time (the late 14th-century) that the friary was home to a friary named Thomas Ratcliffe, who was regarded as a renowned preacher.

The friary was surrendered for dissolution in November 1538. The friary does not appear to have been very large. At dissolution it was home to the Prior and three friars, and owned only the land it stood upon and a few small properties within the town. The annual income of the priory was listed as only £1.

The friary was unusual in having two cloisters.

References

Monasteries in Leicestershire
Augustinian monasteries in England
Monasteries dissolved under the English Reformation